The 2021 Saint John's Johnnies football team represented Saint John's University as a member of the Minnesota Intercollegiate Athletic Conference (MIAC) during the 2021 NCAA Division III football season. Led by eighth-year head coach Gary Fasching, the Johnnies compiled an overall record of 11–1 with a mark of 8–0 in conference play. The Johnnies played home games at Clemens Stadium in Collegeville, Minnesota.

Schedule

References

Saint John's
Saint John's Johnnies football seasons
Saint John's Johnnies football